Events from the year 1855 in Scotland.

Incumbents

Law officers 
 Lord Advocate – James Moncreiff
 Solicitor General for Scotland – James Craufurd; then Thomas Mackenzie; then Edward Maitland

Judiciary 
 Lord President of the Court of Session and Lord Justice General – Lord Colonsay
 Lord Justice Clerk – Lord Glencorse

Events 
 1 January – civil registry of births, deaths and marriages in Scotland replaces parish church registers.
 c. February – establishment of the Industrial Museum of Scotland in Edinburgh, a predecessor of the National Museum of Scotland, with chemist George Wilson as its director. In August he is also appointed Regius Professor of Technology in the University of Edinburgh, the first such post in Britain. This year also he publishes Researches on Colour-Blindness.
 16 February – emigrant ship Tornado sails from Broomielaw in Glasgow with 500 settlers bound for Melbourne.
 25 July – Robert Napier and Sons launch  on the River Clyde, the first iron-hulled ship for the Cunard Line and the world's largest at this date (3300 grt, 398 ft (121 m)).
 5 November – Inverness and Nairn Railway opened, connecting Inverness to the railway network.
 17 November – explorer David Livingstone discovers Victoria Falls in Africa.
 St Paul's Cathedral, Dundee, completed as an Episcopal church.
 Pier opened at Blairmore on Loch Long.
 The hydropathic establishment in Bridge of Allan is opened.
 Edinburgh Medical Journal first published.

Births 
 27 March – James Alfred Ewing, physicist and engineer (died 1935)
 25 May – Florence Dixie, born Lady Florence Douglas, war correspondent and feminist (died 1905)
 14 October – William York Macgregor, landscape painter (died 1923)
 25 October – Grace Cadell, pioneer physician, surgeon, novelist and militant suffragette (died 1918)
 12 September – William Sharp, writer (died 1905 in Sicily)
 November 8 – James Williamson, photographer (died 1933)
 18 November – Archibald Barr, mechanical engineer (died 1931)
 23 December – Charles Alexander Stevenson, lighthouse engineer (died 1950)
 George Johnston, automobile engineer (died 1945)

Deaths 
 20 February – Joseph Hume, doctor and Radical MP (born 1777)
 11 March – James Gillespie Graham, architect (born 1776)
 6 April – Robert Davidson, peasant poet (born 1778)
 18 September – James Finlay Weir Johnston, agricultural chemist (born 1796)

See also 
 Timeline of Scottish history
 1855 in the United Kingdom

References 

 
Years of the 19th century in Scotland
Scotland
1850s in Scotland